Fresnois-la-Montagne is a commune in the Meurthe-et-Moselle department in north-eastern France.

See also
Communes of the Meurthe-et-Moselle department

References

External links
 Site for the village Fresnois-la-Montagne

Fresnoislamontagne